Milosav Jovanović (May 3, 1935 in Oparić, nearby Jagodina – March 5, 2014 in Begaljica, near Belgrade) is a Serbian Outsider art and naive art painter.

Biography 
Jovanović was born in Oparić, a village near Jagodina, Serbia, in 1935. He resided in Begaljica, a village near Belgrade, where he lived until his death, in 2014. He began doing painting in 1955. He is considered to be one of the foremost contributors to the naive art genre, with a worldwide reputation. He is considered to be one of the foremost contributors to the Serbian outsider art and naive art genres in former Yugoslavia and later on, in Serbia. Because of his original artistic expression and characteristic technique of painting, he got a worldwide reputation.

Artistic style 
The focus of his interest was Eros and Tanathos. By painting landscapes the artist described the interior of his visions composed of suppressed fears, lost hopes and erotic phantasmagoria. The combination of spontaneous and instinctive presentation of the subject matter and its patient pictorial development is surprising. In his works of dense intensity in artistic expression and mystic messages, the inclination towards the decorative is combined with inner symbolical tension. The painter superficially distributed stylized shapes on the surface of the painting, avoiding empty areas and animating them using characteristic colour signs. These are short strokes in the shape of dots, blots, broken and parallel lines, circles or rhombus. The artist thereby intensifies the strength of experience by employing raw tint. His colour is not a coat but the texture. It brings pronounced energy and warmth, but reduces the predominance of the subject matter in its entire suggestiveness. The structure of forms which is especially interesting for the artist reveals his horror vacui therefore, he is persistently devoted to each segment of the coloured pigment, construing miniature cones over the flat surface. The encounters of red and greed reveal the passion of his chromatic expression, while his drawings, as a separate artistic branch, show even more inventive approach to the presentation of the vision itself.
His drawing in Indian ink is a special quality within his oeuvre.  
The pronounced continuity, permeation, intertwining of vibrant graphic, filled and empty surfaces, i.e. black and white, optically contributes to the kinetics of pictorial elements.
He had independent and group shows in the country and abroad.

Exhibitions and awards 
From 1960 Milosav Jovanović participated in significant international exhibitions and biennial and triennial events worldwide. 
From 1966, he exhibited at World Triennial in Bratislava. He received a series of recognition, including the Award for Entire Artistic Work at the Eleventh Biennial in MNMA, Jagodina, Serbia.

Gallery

References

Literature 

 Oto Bihalji-Merin; Nebojša Bato Tomašević, Enciklopedija naivne umetnosti sveta, Beograd, 1984
 N. Krstić, Outsider Art in Serbia, monograph, MNMA, Jagodina, 2014, pp. 98–105
 М. Бошковић; М. Маширевић,Самоуки ликовни уметници у Србији, Торино, 1977
 N. Krstić, Naivna umetnost Srbije, SANU, Jagodina, 2003
 N. Krstić, Naivna i marginalna umetnost Srbije, MNMA, Jagodina, 2007
 N. Krstić, Outsiders, catalogue, MNMA, Jagodina, 2013

External links 

 Milosav Jovanović, Museum of Naïve and Marginal Art, Jagodina, Serbia
 Milosav Jovanović, Museum of Naïve and Marginal Art, Jagodina, Serbia

Outsider artists
Naïve painters
20th-century Serbian painters
Yugoslav painters
People from Oparić
1935 births
2014 deaths
Serbian male painters
20th-century Serbian male artists